Allen Dines (November 20, 1921 – December 17, 2020) was an American politician in the state of Colorado. He was a member of the Colorado House of Representatives from 1957 to 1966, and the Colorado Senate from 1966 to 1974. From 1965 to 1966, Dines served as Speaker of the Colorado House of Representatives after previously serving as House Majority Leader from 1961 to 1962, and Minority Leader from 1963 to 1964.

Dines was born in Denver and attended Yale University and Harvard Law School where he attained a law degree. From 1943 to 1946, he served in World War II with the United States Naval Reserve in the Caribbean and Pacific theatres. He later practiced law in Denver.

He died on December 17, 2020, at the age of 99, in an in-home hospice.

References

1921 births
2020 deaths
Democratic Party Colorado state senators
Harvard Law School alumni
Military personnel from Colorado
Politicians from Denver
Speakers of the Colorado House of Representatives
Democratic Party members of the Colorado House of Representatives
United States Navy personnel of World War II
United States Navy reservists
Yale University alumni